Jonathan Yao-Lante Asamoah (born July 21, 1988) is a former offensive guard who played in the National Football League (NFL). He was drafted by the Kansas City Chiefs in the third round of the 2010 NFL Draft. He played college football at Illinois. Asamoah was considered one of the top interior offensive linemen for the 2010 NFL Draft. Asamoah has also played for the Atlanta Falcons.

High school career
Asamoah attended Rich East High School in Park Forest, Illinois, where he was a two-time first-team SICA Green All-Conference selection and helped the offense to gain over 3,100 rushing yards.  He was an All-State selection by the Chicago Sun-Times, and an All-Midwest Region selection by PrepStar.

Considered a two-star recruit by Rivals.com, Asamoah was not ranked among the nation's best offensive linemen prospects in 2005. He originally committed to Northern Illinois, but reconsidered his choice after he received an offer by Illinois.

College career
In his initial year at Illinois, Asamoah played in five of the last six games of the season at offensive guard as a true freshman. In 2007, he started at right guard in all 13 games and was in on 991 offensive plays. He recorded 80 knockdowns, blocking for 2007 Big Ten Player of the Year Rashard Mendenhall, who later was a first-round selection in the 2008 NFL Draft.

In his junior season, Asamoah was part of an offensive line that has helped the Illini rank first in the Big Ten in total offense (448.3) and pass offense (274.5) and second in scoring offense (30.4) through 11 games.

In 2009, Asamoah was listed at No. 5 on Rivals.com′s preseason interior lineman power ranking. He was also named to the 2009 Outland Trophy watch list.

Professional career

2010 NFL Draft
Sports Illustrated noted he "lacks great bulk but is a solid run blocker." Asamoah was selected in the third round, 68th overall, by the Kansas City Chiefs. He was the highest selected Illinois offensive lineman since Brad Hopkins in 1993.

Kansas City Chiefs
Asamoah started one game in the 2010 NFL season. It was a game against the Buffalo Bills. The next season, Asamoah started all games of the season.

In 2013, he was expected to compete with Geoff Schwartz for playing time at guard. He ended up starting nine games.

Atlanta Falcons
Asamoah signed with the Atlanta Falcons on March 11, 2014.

He was cut by the Falcons on December 21, 2015.

References

External links
Atlanta Falcons bio
Kansas City Chiefs bio
Illinois Fighting Illini bio

1988 births
Living people
American football offensive linemen
American sportspeople of Ghanaian descent
Atlanta Falcons players
Illinois Fighting Illini football players
Kansas City Chiefs players
People from Matteson, Illinois
Players of American football from Illinois
Sportspeople from Cook County, Illinois